András Szatmári (born 3 February 1993) is a Hungarian right-handed sabre fencer, 2018 team European champion, 2017 individual world champion, and 2021 team Olympic bronze medalist.

Career
Szatmári took up fencing to follow the steps of his father, who fenced at Vasas SC. His first coach was György Gerevich, son of seven-time Olympic fencer Aladár Gerevich, who also trained Áron Szilágyi and Csanád Gémesi. Szatmári was Junior European Champion and U23 European Championship in 2012 and won the silver medal in the 2013 Junior World Championships in Poreč.

He reached the quarter-finals in the 2013 World Championships in home city Budapest, where he was defeated by Russia's Nikolay Kovalev, who eventually took the silver medal. He was part of the Hungarian team that reached the semi-finals at the 2014 World Championships in Kazan, lost to South Korea, but defeated Russia to earn the bronze medal.

Medal Record

Olympic Games

World Championship

European Championship

Grand Prix

World Cup

Awards
Hungarian Fencer of the Year: 2017

Orders and special awards
  Hungarian Cross of Merit – Gold Cross (2021)

References

External links

 
  (archive)
 
 

Hungarian male sabre fencers
1993 births
Martial artists from Budapest
Living people
Fencers at the 2010 Summer Youth Olympics
Universiade medalists in fencing
Universiade gold medalists for Hungary
World Fencing Championships medalists
Medalists at the 2017 Summer Universiade
Fencers at the 2020 Summer Olympics
Medalists at the 2020 Summer Olympics
Olympic medalists in fencing
Olympic fencers of Hungary
Olympic bronze medalists for Hungary
20th-century Hungarian people
21st-century Hungarian people